This glossary of power electronics is a list of definitions of terms and concepts related to power electronics in general and power electronic capacitors in particular. For more definitions in electric engineering, see Glossary of electrical and electronics engineering. For terms related to engineering in general, see Glossary of engineering.

The glossary terms fit in the following categories in power electronics:

 Electronic power converters; converters, rectifiers, inverters, filters.
 Electronic power switches and electronic AC power converters; switches and controllers.
 Essential components of electric power equipment; device, stack, assembly, reactor, capacitor, transformer, AC filter, DC filter, snubber circuit.
 Circuits and circuit elements of power electronic equipment; arms and connections.
 Operations within power electronic equipment; commutations, quenchings, controls, angles, factors, states, directions, intervals, periods, frequencies, voltages, breakthroughs and failures, breakdowns, blocking and flows.
 Properties of power electronic equipment
 Characteristic curves of power electronic equipment
 Power supplies

A

B

C

D

E

F

H

I

J

L

M

N

O

P

Q

R

S

T

U

V

Overview of electronic power converters

See also 
 Glossary of engineering
 Glossary of civil engineering
 Glossary of mechanical engineering
 Glossary of structural engineering

Notes

References

Attribution

External links

Websites 

 Online Electrotechnical Vocabulary
 A Glossary of Electrical Terms
 Electronic Terminology
 Electronics Glossary
 Glossary / Dictionary of Electronics Terms

PDFs 

 Pictorial Glossary
 Electrical Engineering Dictionary

Electrical engineering
Electronic engineering
Power electronics
Power electronics
Power electronics
Wikipedia glossaries using description lists